Facundo Argüello and Agustín Velotti were the defending champions but decided not to participate.
Andrés Molteni and Fernando Romboli defeated Marcelo Demoliner and Sergio Galdós 6–4, 6–4 in the final.

Seeds

Draw

Draw

References
 Main Draw

Lima Challenger - Doubles
2013 Doubles